Chowilla is a locality in the Australian state of  South Australia, located on the northern side of the Murray River about  to the north-east of the capital city of Adelaide and about  to the north-east of the town of Renmark, and which is bounded by the border with New South Wales in the east.

The locality was established on 26 April 2013 in respect to “the long established local name.”

The land use within Chowilla is concerned with the following protected areas, the Chowilla Game Reserve and the Chowilla Regional Reserve which have fully occupied its extent since its establishment in 2013.

There are three historic sites within Chowilla which have been listed on the South Australian Heritage Register: the Suicide Bridge (or Lunatic Bridge), including nearby remnant posts from the New South Wales-South Australia telegraph line and Littra House, both near Lake Littra, and Todd's Obelisk, near the New South Wales border.

The 2016 Australian census which was conducted in August 2016 reports that Chowilla had a population of zero.

Chowilla is located within the federal Division of Barker, the state electoral district of Chaffey, the Pastoral Unincorporated Area of South Australia and the state's Murray and Mallee region.

See also
Riverland Biosphere Reserve

References

Towns in South Australia
Places in the unincorporated areas of South Australia
Riverland
Murray Mallee